Catalyst is an Australian science journalism television program broadcast by the Australian Broadcasting Corporation (ABC). The program is currently the only science show on primetime television in Australia. Launched in 2001, it replaced Quantum which had ceased the previous year. Catalyst is regularly broadcast on ABC TV at 8:30 pm on Tuesdays and repeated at 6:00 pm on Sundays.

Overview
The show broadcasts stories on scientific themes, and in particular significant recent developments and discoveries. It focuses primarily on stories relevant to Australia, but the series covers international developments as well. It attempts to convey information in a way that is not only accurate but also interesting and informative to the general population, often discussing the ethical, political and other implications of scientific discoveries and research as well as the discoveries themselves.

The show's website describes it as follows:

Prime examples of Catalyst featured segments include "Corporate Psychopaths", "The Truth About Vitamins", and "Smell and Schizophrenia".

The show originally was broadcast in a 30-minute format. Following a series of controversies and an internal review of the program, the ABC announced in November 2016 that Catalyst would shift to a 60-minute format starting in 2017.

The new format utilises out-of-house experts in their respective fields, presenting 60-minute in depth documentaries. Episodes have included "The Great Australian Bee Challenge", "Bionic Revolution", "Feeding Australia" and "The Secret To Making Better Decisions".

Staff
The Catalyst team is composed of specialised science journalists, science communicators and producers, each with different specialisations and roles. Over Catalyst's history, the staff has included:

Presenters and reporters

Maryanne Demasi, science journalist, medical research scientist
Alan Duffy, astronomer
Tim Flannery, palaeontologist and environmental activist
Joanna McMillan, dietitian
Derek Muller, physicist
Shalin Naik, stem cell biologist
Jonica Newby, veterinarian
Jordan Nguyen, biomedical engineer
Graham Phillips, astrophysicist
Lily Serna, mathematician
Nikki Stamp, cardiothoracic and transplant surgeon
Brad McKay, GP
Anja Taylor
Paul West, former chef and farmer
Caroline West, GP
Sarah McKay, neuroscientist.

Researchers 
 Dominique Pile
 Amy Sherden
 Ariane Hall
 Claire Smith

Controversy
A series of episodes ("Heart of the Matter", parts 1 and 2) broadcast in October 2013 which questioned the link between saturated fat, cholesterol and heart disease, as well as the widespread use of anti-cholesterol drugs known as statins, came under criticism from doctors and the National Heart Foundation of Australia. The foundation estimates that in the wake of those episodes up to 55,000 patients may have stopped taking their medication, leading to a potential increase in heart attacks and strokes over the next five years. In May 2014 the ABC removed both episodes from its website, after an internal review found that the second episode (but not the first) involved one breach of ABC standards on impartiality and there was a problem of omission of important information.

"Wi-Fried?", an episode broadcast in February 2016 featuring American epidemiologist Devra Davis, courted further controversy by claiming that electromagnetic radiation emitted by devices such as mobile phones lead to an increased risk of brain cancer in heavy users, contrary to the mainstream view that exposure to such emissions is largely safe. The show faced criticism from local experts, viewers and scientists disputing the episode's claims, with public health professor Simon Chapman stating that "this is not the first time Catalyst have aired a questionable episode, and there really needs to be a review of their editorial process". An investigation by the ABC's independent Audience and Consumer Affairs Unit found that the episode breached editorial policies standards on accuracy and impartiality, later leading to the withdrawal of the episode from the ABC website. The controversy led to the temporary suspension of reporter Dr. Maryanne Demasi from the show and is the second time since Heart of the Matter, Parts 1 and 2 to have breached editorial standards. It also led to the ABC reviewing the future strategy and direction of the program, leading to format changes for the following series.

See also
 Nova
BBC Horizon
 List of Australian television series
 List of longest-running Australian television series

References

External links
Official website
The Lab – ABC science gateway

Australian non-fiction television series
Australian Broadcasting Corporation original programming
2001 Australian television series debuts
2010s Australian television series
Documentary television series about science
Documentary television series about technology
English-language television shows